Phacelia ramosissima is a species of phacelia known by the common name branching phacelia. It is native to western North America from British Columbia to California and the Southwestern United States, where it can be found in many types of habitat.

It is variable in appearance, and there are many intergrading varieties. In general it is a spreading or sprawling prostrate or upright perennial herb which may approach 1.5 meters (4.5 feet) in stem length. It is branched, hairless to densely hairy, and sometimes glandular. The leaves are 4 to 20 centimeters long and most are divided into several toothed or lobed leaflets. The inflorescence is a one-sided curving or coiling cyme of funnel- or bell-shaped flowers. Each flower is under a centimeter long and white to lavender in color with protruding stamens.

References

External links
Jepson Manual Treatment
Photo gallery

ramosissima
Flora of California
Flora of the California desert regions
Flora of the Sierra Nevada (United States)
Flora of the West Coast of the United States
Flora of the Southwestern United States
Flora of the Northwestern United States
Natural history of the California chaparral and woodlands
Plants described in 1830
Flora without expected TNC conservation status